Marginalia is a collection of Fantasy, Horror and Science fiction short stories, essays, biography and poetry by and about the American author H. P. Lovecraft. It was released in 1944 and was the third collection of Lovecraft's work published by Arkham House.  2,035 copies were printed.

The contents of this volume were selected by August Derleth and Donald Wandrei.  The dust-jacket art is a reproduction of Virgil Finlay's illustration for Lovecraft's story "The Shunned House."

Contents

Marginalia contains the following:

 "Foreword," by August Derleth & Donald Wandrei
 "Imprisoned with the Pharaohs" (with Harry Houdini)
 "Medusa's Coil" (with Zealia Brown (Reed) Bishop)
 "Winged Death" (with Hazel Heald)
 "The Man of Stone" (with Hazel Heald)
 "Notes on the Writing of Weird Fiction"
 "Some Notes on Interplanetary Fiction"
 "Lord Dunsany and His Work"
 "Heritage or Modernism: Common Sense in Art Forms"
 "Some Backgrounds of Fairyland"
 "Some Causes of Self-Immolation"
 "A Guide to Charleston, South Carolina"
 "Observations on Several Parts of North America"
 "The Beast in the Cave"
 "The Transition of Juan Romero"
 "Azathoth"
 "The Book"
 "The Descendant"
 "The Very Old Folk"
 "The Thing in the Moonlight"
 "Two Comments"
 "His Own Most Fantastic Creation" by Winfield Townley Scott
 "Some Random Memories" by Frank Belknap Long
 "H. P. Lovecraft: An Appreciation" by T. O. Mabbott
 "The Wind That Is in the Grass: A Memoir of H. P. Lovecraft" by R. H. Barlow
 "Lovecraft and Science" by Kenneth Sterling
 "Lovecraft as a Formative Influence" by August Derleth
 "The Dweller in Darkness" by Donald Wandrei
 "To Howard Phillips Lovecraft" by Clark Ashton Smith
 "H.P.L." by Henry Kuttner
 "Lost Dream" by Emil Petaja
 "To Howard Phillips Lovecraft" by Francis Flagg
 "Elegy: In Providence the Spring ..." by August Derleth
 "From the Outsider: H. P. Lovecraft" by Charles E. White
 "In Memoriam: H. P. Lovecraft" by Richard Ely Morse

Reception
New York Times reviewer Marjorie Farber said Marginalia "should cause intense satisfaction among the disciples of the late great Master of Necrology", commenting that Lovecraft's "whole career seems an effective protest against 'natural laws', against genuine scholarship and against literary craftsmanship". E. F. Bleiler noted that "The guest memoirs and essays are of varying interest", but that "Lovecraft's fiction is juvenile or minor. His essays are more significant". Lovecraft bibliographer Francis T. Laney described the volume as "a glorified fan magazine in book format. . . . [presenting] an unforgettable composite view of Lovecraft as a man".

References

1944 anthologies
American anthologies
Short story collections by H. P. Lovecraft
Essay collections
Arkham House books